Natik Bagirov (born 7 September 1964) is an ethnic Azerbaijani judoka from Belarus.

Achievements

References
 
 sports-reference

1964 births
Living people
Belarusian male judoka
Belarusian people of Azerbaijani descent
Judoka at the 1996 Summer Olympics
Judoka at the 2000 Summer Olympics
Olympic judoka of Belarus
20th-century Belarusian people